William Garrity "TJ" Bush (born October 27, 1997) is an American soccer player who plays as a goalkeeper for South Georgia Tormenta in the USL League One.

Career

Youth
Bush attended South Lakes High School, where he was a four-year varsity letter winner. He earned honors including First Team All-Liberty Conference, Second Team All-Region 6A North and Washington Post All-Metropolitan Area Honorable Mention as a junior, then All-Liberty Conference Honorable Mention as a sophomore. Whilst at high school, Bush also played club soccer with Southwestern Youth Association Strikers.

College & Amateur
In 2016, Bush began playing college soccer at James Madison University. He didn't make an appearance in his freshman year, but went on to make 66 appearances for the Dukes and claimed the record for career shutouts at James Madison with 30. Through his college career, Bush was named CAA All-Rookie Team, was two-time All-CAA First Team selection, and was CAA Defender of the Year and VaSID Defensive Player of the Year in his senior year.

While at college, Bush appeared in the NPSL for Northern Virginia United in 2018, making four appearances. In 2019, he made seven appearances for GPS Portland Phoenix in the USL League Two.

Professional
On January 21, 2021, Bush was selected 80th overall in the 2021 MLS SuperDraft by Seattle Sounders FC. However, he didn't sign a contract with the club.

Bush signed his first professional contract on July 22, 2021, joining USL Championship side Charlotte Independence.

On February 17, 2022, Bush signed with USL League One club South Georgia Tormenta. He made his professional debut on April 30, 2022, starting in a 2–0 win over FC Tucson.

References

External links 
 

1997 births
Living people
American soccer players
Association football goalkeepers
Charlotte Independence players
GPS Portland Phoenix players
James Madison Dukes men's soccer players
National Premier Soccer League players
People from Herndon, Virginia
Seattle Sounders FC draft picks
Soccer players from Virginia
Tormenta FC players
USL League One players
USL League Two players